In Kapampangan mythology, Mayari is the goddess of the moon and ruler of the world during nighttime.

In Tagalog mythology
According to Hiligaynon anthropologist F. Landa Jocano—in "Notes on Philippine Divinities" (1968)—the ancient Tagalogs worshipped a lunar goddess named Mayari who is said to be the most beautiful divinity in the celestial court. She had two sisters, Hanan, the goddess of the morning, and Tala, the goddess of the stars. They were said to be the daughters of Bathala by a mortal woman who died after she had given birth to them. Bathala took these three sisters to the sky and made them members of her court. Unfortunately, there is no known historical records or documentations which mentioned a lunar deity (or anito) of the ancient Tagalogs—other than Buwan and Kúlalayíng—named Mayari. Neither a deity named Hanan, who is actually a Visayan hero god. On some of his entries on Tagalog deities including Mayari, Jocano failed to cite any source for them nor did he mention if he got their myths from oral tradition. 

According to the Spanish chroniclers the ancient Tagalogs revered the moon (Buwan) as a deity, especially when it was new (the first sliver of the moon), at which time they held great rejoicings, adoring it and bidding it welcome, asking it to provide them with a lot of gold; others for a lot of rice; others that it give them a beautiful wife or a noble husband who is well-mannered and rich; others that it bestow on them health and long life; in short, everyone asks for what they most desire because they believe and are convinced it can give it to them abundantly. San Buenaventura dictionary lists a prayer dedicated to the moon that was recited during the new moon: “Buwáñg Panginóon kó, payamánin mó akó“ which translates to "Moon, my Lord/Lady, make me rich.” When one is on a mission no matter how important, it is well to desist from accomplishing the mission if a lunar eclipse occurs. A ring which appears around the moon is an indication of the demise of some chief. In these cases, the moon is referred to as bathala a title attributed to heavenly bodies which the early Tagalog people believed predicted events. Part of their devotion to the moon is protect it from Laho – the serpent or dragon who was believed to devour the moon and cause lunar eclipse. When the moon is eclipsed, the people of various districts generally go out into the street or into the open fields, with bells, panastanes, etc. They strike them with great force and violence in order that they might thereby protect the moon which they say is being eaten or swallowed by the dragon, tiger, or crocodile. If they wish to say “the eclipse of the moon” it is very common among them to use this locution, saying "Linamon laho bovan" ("Laho is swallowing the moon"). The Spaniards believed that the Tagalogs learned this practice from the Sangley (Chinese). Another name for the moon or the proper name for the anito of the moon is Colalaiyng (Kulalaying – Jew's harp) {N&S 1754: 151-152: Colalaiyng. pc. Asi llamaban á la luna, ó á una doncella en la luna, segun sus consejas.}. The Tagalogs from Laguna called her “Dalágañg nása Buwán”  (Maiden in the Moon), in reference to the image formed by the shadow on the moon, which they see as a face (sangmukti) of a young maid (doncella). Ceremonies of her cult were regularly performed at the new moon and the full moon with offerings of roosters made to fly in her direction. She was also referred to as “Dalágañg Binúbúkot” (Cloistered Maiden). In ancient Tagalog society, some virgins were cloistered like nuns or as amongs Muslims, the term used to refer to them were binúkot (SB 1613:279; N&S 1860:266) and kinalî (N&S 1860:266; Pang. 1972:287). The reason for this custom is not explained, but may have been a Muslim one.

In Kapampangan mythology
In Kampampangan mythology, Bathala, the creator of the world, died without leaving a will. His children Apolaki and Mayari had a quarrel, for each wanted to rule the world alone. The two fought out the conflict with bamboo clubs, back and forth they fought until at last Apolaki struck Mayari in the face and she became blind in one eye. When he saw his sister stricken, Apolaki took pity on her and agreed to rule the earth together but at different times. However, her light is dimmer than her brother's due to the loss of her eye.

In Sambal mythology

In Sambal mythology, Malayari is chief god of the Sambals, who premoniantly live in Zambales. He is the creator of all things, and the omnipotent ruler over life and death. Malayari is a compassionate and loving god, sending rain, health, wealth and abundance to those who deserve it, but punishing those who ignore his commandments. ¶

See also
Deities of Philippine mythology
List of lunar deities

References

Lunar goddesses
Tagalog goddesses
War goddesses
Hunting goddesses
Lunar gods
Creator gods